Leijonhufvud or Germanized as Lewenhaupt is the name of a Swedish noble family, from which some of the family members were  granted baronial title. The baronial branch was 1568 granted the status of counts, and changed their family name to Lewenhaupt. There are still living members of both the branch of the family belonging to the lower nobility and the baronial one.

Notable members 
Peter Leijonhufvud (1717–1789), Swedish Baron, Officer
Gabriel Leijonhufvud the Elder (1755–1826), Swedish Baron, Officer, Freemason
Gabriel Leijonhufvud the Younger (1812–1897), Swedish Baron, Officer, diplomat 
Axel Leijonhufvud (1933–2022), Swedish economist
Ebba Leijonhufvud, (1595–1654), Swedish noble, Countess of Raseborg
Johan Leijonhufvud (born 1971), Swedish jazz guitarist
Margaret Leijonhufvud (1516–1551), Queen of Sweden
Martha Leijonhufvud (1520–1584), Swedish noble
Sigrid Leijonhufvud (1862–1937), Swedish author and historian

Swedish-language surnames
Leijonhufvud family
Swedish noble families